Lin Zhaonan was a Chinese diplomat. He was Ambassador of the People's Republic of China to Syria (1983–1986).

References

Ambassadors of China to Syria
Possibly living people